Villadepera de Sayago is a rural municipality of the Spanish Zamora Province.  On January 1, 2001 Villadepera had a total population of 282.

Villadepera is situated in a region where the Douro forms narrow canyons for 112 km, and that has now a protected status as the International Douro Natural Park.

References

External links
List of municipalities in Zamora

Municipalities of the Province of Zamora